Tacoma Defiance (formerly Seattle Sounders FC 2) is an American soccer club based in Tacoma, WA, that competes in the United Soccer League, the third tier of the United States Soccer Pyramid, as the reserve team of Seattle Sounders FC. The club was founded on October 14, 2014, and played its first match on March 21, 2015, at the Starfire Sports Complex in Tukwila. Tacoma Defiance is operated and managed by Seattle Sounders FC, while 20 percent of the club is fan-owned through the non-profit Sounders Community Trust. Sounders assistant coach Ezra Hendrickson was named the team's coach on November 13, 2014.

Players
Players who were contracted to the club but never played in a game are not listed.

All statistics are for the USL regular season games only, and are correct .

Key

DF = Defender

MF = Midfielder

FW = Forward/striker

SSFC caps = Seattle Sounders FC Appearances

SSFC goals = Seattle Sounders FC Goals

Outfield players

Goalkeepers

Updated through October 14, 2018

By nationality

Notes

References

Lists of soccer players by club in the United States
players
 
Association football player non-biographical articles